The All-Ireland Ladies' Club Football Championship is the ladies' Gaelic football competition for club football teams. The winners are awarded the Dolores Tyrrell Memorial Cup.

Senior championships

Senior finals listed by year

 Ladies' national website incorrectly states that in 1977 Mullahoran beat Newtownshandrum.

Summary of All-Ireland champions

By club

Senior titles listed by county

L, M, U, C refer to Leinster/Munster/Ulster/Connacht championships won by teams from the county.

 Galway deducted one All Ireland title (1984/85) and one Connacht title (1984).
 Mullahoran won the Ulster title or had no competition to represent Ulster from 1977 to 1983 inclusive.

Senior titles listed by province

 Connacht deducted one All Ireland title (Galway Gaels 1984/85).

Intermediate championships

Intermediate finals listed by year

 No club was won the title more than once.

Intermediate wins listed by county

Junior championships

Junior finals listed by year

No club has won the title more than once.

Junior wins listed by county

References

Outside Sources
 Ladies Gaelic Roll of Honour

 
Ladies' Gaelic football competitions
1977 establishments in Ireland